City University of Science and Information Technology, Peshawar (CUSIT) is a private-sector university based in Peshawar, Khyber Pakhtunkhwa, Pakistan. It is chartered by the government of Khyber Pakhtunkhwa, recognized by the Higher Education Commission (HEC), and allowed to operate by the Pakistan Engineering Council (PEC).

History and progress 
Founded in 1979. Initially, a primary school was established by Muhammad Zahoor Sethi (Founder), comprising just one moderate campus with 300 students. But, in due course of time, the establishment of eleven separate school campuses, four degree college campuses for boys and two degree college campuses for girls, with a combined strength of over 26,000 students. Currently, the university is managed by teams of Board Of Governors, Academic Council, Board of Advanced Studies & Research, Selection Board and Finance & Planning Committee.

Faculties 
Currently, there are ten faculties:
 Faculty of Computer Science & IT
 Faculty of Management Sciences
 Faculty of Electrical Engineering
 Faculty of Civil Engineering
 Faculty of Architecture
 Faculty of Education
 Faculty of Mathematics
 Faculty of Health Sciences
 Faculty of English
Faculty of Engineering Technology

References

External links 
 

2001 establishments in Pakistan
Educational institutions established in 2001
Private universities and colleges in Khyber Pakhtunkhwa
Universities and colleges in Peshawar
Peshawar District